One Sock Missing is the second album by the American band the Grifters, released in 1993 on Shangri-La Records. The album was an underground hit. It was reissued by Fat Possum Records in 2016.

Production
The album was in part recorded at Easley McCain Recording, in Memphis, Tennessee. "I Arise" is a bonus track on the vinyl format of the album.

Critical reception

Trouser Press wrote that "Shouse and Taylor (who split vocals) often slip into a laconic saunter that’s a little too close for comfort to Pavement frontman Stephen Malkmus’ slacker slump." Billboard called "Corolla Hoist" "one of the great lofi singles." The Staten Island Advance praised the band's "process of chopping, skewing, rearranging and mixing the standard formulas of various musical genres into a whole new ball of wax."

AllMusic stated: "Certainly the most low-key (if not lo-fi) of the Grifters' early records, 1993's One Sock Missing is less noisy and aggressive than its immediate predecessor, So Happy Together." Magnet noted: "Few indie-rock groups of this time pulled off such an emotionally cathartic and powerful mix of desperate darkness, dynamic heaviness, convincingly abstract drug-influenced weirdness, unbelievably infectious and gorgeous hooks, real wall-shredding sheets of noise and discordance, and low-key every-guy approachability."

Track listing

Album credits

Grifters
credited as
 Stank Gallimore
 Tripp Lampshade
 Diamond Dave Shouse
 Slim Taylor

Additional musicians
Greg Easterly (Compulsive Gamblers) – Violins and Bass on Wonder

Skronkadelic Orchestra Unlimited on I Arise
 Jack Adcock – Gourd
 Jimmy Enck – Sax in Tune
 Robert Gordon – Jamming Untensil
 Fields Trimble (Compulsive Gamblers) – Saxophone
sitting in
 Jim Cole – Kwirrr Machine
 Sherman Willmott (Shangri-La Records) – Bike Horn
 Roy Berry (The Simple Ones)

Additional credits
 Largely recorded at the Flower Shop by Roy Berry
 Additional recording and mixing at Easley Studios by Doug Easley & Davis McCain
 Album and disc art by Roy Berry
 Cover drawing by Tripp Lamkins
 Cover design by Paul W. Ringger XXIV
 Paintings of the Grifters as a young band by Kelly
 Cover production by Towery Publishing

References

Grifters (band) albums
1993 albums